In mathematics, a Riesel number is an odd natural number k for which  is composite for all natural numbers n . In other words, when k is a Riesel number, all members of the following set are composite:

If the form is instead , then k is a Sierpinski number.

Riesel Problem 

In 1956, Hans Riesel showed that there are an infinite number of integers k such that  is not prime for any integer n. He showed that the number 509203 has this property, as does 509203 plus any positive integer multiple of 11184810. The Riesel problem consists in determining the smallest Riesel number. Because no covering set has been found for any k less than 509203, it is conjectured to be the smallest Riesel number.

To check if there are k < 509203, the Riesel Sieve project (analogous to Seventeen or Bust for Sierpinski numbers) started with 101 candidates k. As of December 2022, 56 of these k had been eliminated by Riesel Sieve, PrimeGrid, or outside persons. The remaining 44 values of k that have yielded only composite numbers for all values of n so far tested are

23669, 31859, 38473, 46663, 67117, 74699, 81041, 97139, 107347, 121889, 129007, 143047, 161669, 206231, 215443, 226153, 234343, 245561, 250027, 315929, 319511, 324011, 325123, 327671, 336839, 342847, 344759, 362609, 363343, 364903, 365159, 368411, 371893, 384539, 386801, 397027, 409753, 444637, 470173, 474491, 477583, 485557, 494743.

The most recent elimination was in November 2022, when 93839 × 215337656 − 1 was found to be prime by Ryan Propper. This number is 4,617,100 digits long.

As of December 2022, PrimeGrid has searched the remaining candidates up to n = 14,000,000.

Known Riesel numbers 
The sequence of currently known Riesel numbers begins with:
509203, 762701, 777149, 790841, 992077, 1106681, 1247173, 1254341, 1330207, 1330319, 1715053, 1730653, 1730681, 1744117, 1830187, 1976473, 2136283, 2251349, 2313487, 2344211, 2554843, 2924861, ...

Covering set 
A number can be shown to be a Riesel number by exhibiting a covering set: a set of prime numbers that will divide any member of the sequence, so called because it is said to "cover" that sequence. The only proven Riesel numbers below one million have covering sets as follows:
  has covering set {3, 5, 7, 13, 17, 241}
  has covering set {3, 5, 7, 13, 17, 241}
  has covering set {3, 5, 7, 13, 19, 37, 73}
  has covering set {3, 5, 7, 13, 19, 37, 73}
  has covering set {3, 5, 7, 13, 17, 241}.

The smallest n for which k · 2n − 1 is prime 

Here is a sequence  for k = 1, 2, .... It is defined as follows:  is the smallest n ≥ 0 such that  is prime, or -1 if no such prime exists.
2, 1, 0, 0, 2, 0, 1, 0, 1, 1, 2, 0, 3, 0, 1, 1, 2, 0, 1, 0, 1, 1, 4, 0, 3, 2, 1, 3, 4, 0, 1, 0, 2, 1, 2, 1, 1, 0, 3, 1, 2, 0, 7, 0, 1, 3, 4, 0, 1, 2, 1, 1, 2, 0, 1, 2, 1, 3, 12, 0, 3, 0, 2, 1, 4, 1, 5, 0, 1, 1, 2, 0, 7, 0, 1, ... . The first unknown n is for that k = 23669.

Simultaneously Riesel and Sierpiński
A number may be simultaneously Riesel and Sierpiński. These are called Brier numbers. The five smallest known examples are 3316923598096294713661, 10439679896374780276373, 11615103277955704975673, 12607110588854501953787, 17855036657007596110949, ....

The dual Riesel problem
The dual Riesel numbers are defined as the odd natural numbers k such that |2n - k| is composite for all natural numbers n. There is a conjecture that the set of this numbers is the same as the set of Riesel numbers. For example, |2n - 509203| is composite for all natural numbers n, and 509203 is conjectured to be the smallest dual Riesel number.

The smallest n which 2n - k is prime are (for odd ks, and this sequence requires that 2n > k)
2, 3, 3, 39, 4, 4, 4, 5, 6, 5, 5, 6, 5, 5, 5, 7, 6, 6, 11, 7, 6, 29, 6, 6, 7, 6, 6, 7, 6, 6, 6, 8, 8, 7, 7, 10, 9, 7, 8, 9, 7, 8, 7, 7, 8, 7, 8, 10, 7, 7, 26, 9, 7, 8, 7, 7, 10, 7, 7, 8, 7, 7, 7, 47, 8, 14, 9, 11, 10, 9, 10, 8, 9, 8, 8, ... 

The odd ks which k - 2n are all composite for all 2n < k (the de Polignac numbers) are
1, 127, 149, 251, 331, 337, 373, 509, 599, 701, 757, 809, 877, 905, 907, 959, 977, 997, 1019, 1087, 1199, 1207, 1211, 1243, 1259, 1271, 1477, ... 

The unknown values of ks are (for which 2n > k)
1871, 2293, 25229, 31511, 36971, 47107, 48959, 50171, 56351, 63431, 69427, 75989, 81253, 83381, 84491, ...

Riesel number base b
One can generalize the Riesel problem to an integer base b ≥ 2. A Riesel number base b is a positive integer k such that gcd(k − 1, b − 1) = 1. (if gcd(k − 1, b − 1) > 1, then gcd(k − 1, b − 1) is a trivial factor of k×bn − 1 (Definition of trivial factors for the conjectures: Each and every n-value has the same factor)) For every integer b ≥ 2, there are infinitely many Riesel numbers base b.

Example 1: All numbers congruent to 84687 mod 10124569 and not congruent to 1 mod 5 are Riesel numbers base 6, because of the covering set {7, 13, 31, 37, 97}. Besides, these k are not trivial since gcd(k + 1, 6 − 1) = 1 for these k. (The Riesel base 6 conjecture is not proven, it has 3 remaining k, namely 1597, 9582 and 57492)

Example 2: 6 is a Riesel number to all bases b congruent to 34 mod 35, because if b is congruent to 34 mod 35, then 6×bn − 1 is divisible by 5 for all even n and divisible by 7 for all odd n. Besides, 6 is not a trivial k in these bases b since gcd(6 − 1, b − 1) = 1 for these bases b.

Example 3: All squares k congruent to 12 mod 13 and not congruent to 1 mod 11 are Riesel numbers base 12, since for all such k, k×12n − 1 has algebraic factors for all even n and divisible by 13 for all odd n. Besides, these k are not trivial since gcd(k + 1, 12 − 1) = 1 for these k. (The Riesel base 12 conjecture is proven)

Example 4: If k is between a multiple of 5 and a multiple of 11, then k×109n − 1 is divisible by either 5 or 11 for all positive integers n. The first few such k are 21, 34, 76, 89, 131, 144, ... However, all these k < 144 are also trivial k (i. e. gcd(k − 1, 109 − 1) is not 1). Thus, the smallest Riesel number base 109 is 144. (The Riesel base 109 conjecture is not proven, it has one remaining k, namely 84)

Example 5: If k is square, then k×49n − 1 has algebraic factors for all positive integers n. The first few positive squares are 1, 4, 9, 16, 25, 36, ... However, all these k < 36 are also trivial k (i. e. gcd(k − 1, 49 − 1) is not 1). Thus, the smallest Riesel number base 49 is 36. (The Riesel base 49 conjecture is proven)

We want to find and proof the smallest Riesel number base b for every integer b ≥ 2. It is a conjecture that if k is a Riesel number base b, then at least one of the three conditions holds:
 All numbers of the form k×bn − 1 have a factor in some covering set. (For example, b = 22, k = 4461, then all numbers of the form k×bn − 1 have a factor in the covering set: {5, 23, 97})
 k×bn − 1 has algebraic factors. (For example, b = 9, k = 4, then k×bn − 1 can be factored to (2×3n − 1) × (2×3n + 1))
 For some n, numbers of the form k×bn − 1 have a factor in some covering set; and for all other n, k×bn − 1 has algebraic factors. (For example, b = 19, k = 144, then if n is odd, then k×bn − 1 is divisible by 5, if n is even, then k×bn − 1 can be factored to (12×19n/2 − 1) × (12×19n/2 + 1))

In the following list, we only consider those positive integers k such that gcd(k − 1, b − 1) = 1, and all integer n must be ≥ 1.

Note: k-values that are a multiple of b and where k−1 is not prime are included in the conjectures (and included in the remaining k with  color if no primes are known for these k-values) but excluded from testing (Thus, never be the k of "largest 5 primes found"), since such k-values will have the same prime as k / b.

Conjectured smallest Riesel number base n are (start with n = 2)
509203, 63064644938, 9, 346802, 84687, 408034255082, 14, 4, 10176, 862, 25, 302, 4, 36370321851498, 9, 86, 246, 144, 8, 560, 4461, 476, 4, 36, 149, 8, 144, 4, 1369, 134718, 10, 16, 6, 287860, 4, 7772, 13, 4, 81, 8, 15137, 672, 4, 22564, 8177, 14, 3226, 36, 16, 64, 900, 5392, 4, 6852, 20, 144, 105788, 4, 121, 13484, 8, 187258666, 9, ...

See also

 Sierpiński number
 Woodall number
 Experimental mathematics
 BOINC
 PrimeGrid

References

Sources

External links
 PrimeGrid
 The Riesel Problem: Definition and Status
 The Prime Glossary: Riesel number
 List of primes of the form: k*2^n-1, k<300
 List of primes of the form: k*2^n-1, k<300, Project Riesel Prime Search
 Riesel and Proth Prime Database

Analytic number theory
Unsolved problems in number theory
Prime numbers